Coyotepec may refer to one of several locations in Mexico: 
 Coyotepec, State of Mexico
 Coyotepec, Puebla
 San Bartolo Coyotepec, Oaxaca
 Santa María Coyotepec, Oaxaca
See also
 Coyotepec Popoloca language, found in Puebla